Slovakia participated in the Eurovision Song Contest 2012 with the song "Don't Close Your Eyes" written and performed by Max Jason Mai, who was internally selected by the Slovak broadcaster Rozhlas a televízia Slovenska (RTVS) to represent Slovakia in the 2012 contest in Baku, Azerbaijan. Max Jason Mai and the song "Don't Close Your Eyes" were announced and presented to the public as the Slovak entry on 7 March 2012.

Slovakia was drawn to compete in the second semi-final of the Eurovision Song Contest which took place on 12 May 2011. Performing during the show in position 5, "I'm Still Alive" was not announced among the top 10 entries of the second semi-final and therefore did not qualify to compete in the final. It was later revealed that Slovakia placed eighteenth (last) out of the 18 participating countries in the semi-final with 22 points.

, this was Slovakia's last entry in the contest, before the country withdrew the following year. The absence has continued in every edition since.

Background 

The nation's best placing in the contest was eighteenth, which it achieved in 1996 with the song "Kým nás máš" performed by Marcel Palonder. Following the introduction of semi-finals in 2004, Slovakia had yet to feature in a final. Slovakia achieved their least successful result in 2009, where they returned to the contest and failed to qualify to the final with the song "Leť tmou" performed by Kamil Mikulčík and Nela Pocisková. In 2011, Slovakia failed to qualify to the final with the song "I'm Still Alive" performed by Twiins.

The Slovak national broadcaster, Rozhlas a televízia Slovenska (RTVS), broadcasts the event within Slovakia and organises the selection process for the nation's entry despite the great popularity of the contest in the country. RTVS had used both national finals and internal selections to select their Eurovision entries. RTVS confirmed their intentions to participate at the 2012 Eurovision Song Contest on 20 December 2011 following rumours that the nation would not be participating due to financial reasons and in order to focus on other shows. In January 2012, the broadcaster announced that the Slovak entry for the 2012 contest would be selected internally.

Before Eurovision

Internal selection
RTVS announced in January 2012 that the Slovak entry for the Eurovision Song Contest 2012 would be selected internally. On 7 March 2012, "Don't Close Your Eyes" composed and performed by Miro Šmajda under the stage name Max Jason Mai was announced by the broadcaster as the Slovak entry for the 2012 Eurovision Song Contest during a press conference. Miro Šmajda previously participated in the Czechoslovak casting show SuperStar in 2009 and placed second. The selection of Max Jason Mai as the Slovak entrant was previously confirmed by RTVS on 16 November 2011 but denied by his management two days later claiming that it was "misunderstood".

At Eurovision
According to Eurovision rules, all nations with the exceptions of the host country and the "Big Five" (France, Germany, Italy, Spain and the United Kingdom) are required to qualify from one of two semi-finals in order to compete for the final; the top ten countries from each semi-final progress to the final. The European Broadcasting Union (EBU) split up the competing countries into six different pots based on voting patterns from previous contests, with countries with favourable voting histories put into the same pot. On 25 January 2012, a special allocation draw was held which placed each country into one of the two semi-finals. Slovakia was placed into the second semi-final, to be held on 24 May 2012.

The running order for the semi-finals was decided through another draw on 20 March 2012 and Slovakia was set to perform in position 15, following the entry from Estonia and before the entry from Norway. At the end of the second semi-final, Slovakia was not announced among the top 10 entries in the first semi-final and therefore failed to qualify to compete in the final. It was later revealed that Slovakia placed eighteenth (last) in the semi-final, receiving a total of 48 points. Slovakia was placed fifteenth by both the public and juries with 32 and 40 points, respectively.

The two semi-finals and the final were broadcast in Slovakia on Jednotka and via radio on Rádio Slovensko with commentary by Roman Bomboš, while the final was also broadcast on via radio on Rádio FM with commentary by Daniel Baláž and Pavol Hubinák. The Slovak spokesperson, who announced the top 12-point score awarded by Slovakia during the final, was Mária Pietrová.

Voting 
Voting during the three shows involved each country awarding points from 1–8, 10 and 12 as determined by a combination of 50% national jury and 50% televoting. Each nation's jury consisted of five music industry professionals who are citizens of the country they represent. This jury judged each entry based on: vocal capacity; the stage performance; the song's composition and originality; and the overall impression by the act. In addition, no member of a national jury was permitted to be related in any way to any of the competing acts in such a way that they cannot vote impartially and independently.

Below is a breakdown of points awarded to Slovakia and awarded by Slovakia in the second semi-final and grand final of the contest. The nation awarded its 12 points to Sweden in both the semi-final and final of the contest.

Points awarded to Slovakia

Points awarded by Slovakia

References

2012
Countries in the Eurovision Song Contest 2012
Eurovision
Eurovision